Gathorne Robert Girdlestone (1881–1950), often known as GRG, was a pioneering orthopaedic surgeon, the founder of the Nuffield Orthopaedic Centre, and the first Nuffield Professor of orthopaedic surgery at the University of Oxford.

Life
Gathorne Robert Girdlestone was born in 1881, the son of Robert Baker Girdlestone, Canon of Christ Church, Oxford and first Principal of Wycliffe Hall, Oxford. He went to Charterhouse and then to New College, Oxford.

Girdlestone died in 1950.

Work
In 1943 Girdlestone described an Orthopedic procedure which is intended to rescue hip joints in humans and more commonly these days, in animals.

The procedure, a Femoral head ostectomy – also known as a Femoral head and neck ostectomy – is a salvage procedure, mostly used in cases of severe damage through Hip dysplasia or Arthritis in which the Head (and, sometimes, the Neck) of the Femur are removed, allowing fibrous tissue to grow in place, creating effectively, a pseudo-joint.

In honor of Professor Girdlestone, this operation is referred to as a Girdlestone procedure.

Recognition
There are two roads near the Nuffield Orthopaedic Centre in Oxford names after Gathorne Girdlestone: Gathorne Road and Girdlestone Road. It is difficult to know whether he would have been pleased with this honour, as he had refused to allow the Wingfield Hospital to bear his name.  The Girdlestone Memorial Library (one of the Bodleian Libraries) at the Nuffield Orthopaedic Centre is named after him.

Publications
The book publications of Gathorne Robert Girdlestone include:
 The Diagnosis & Treatment of Tuberculosis of the Hip. London: Humphrey Milford, 1925.
 The Care and Cure of Crippled Children. The scheme of the Central Committee for the Care of Cripples. Bristol: J. Wright & Sons, 1925.
 Tuberculosis of bone and joint. London: Milford, 1940.
 A Regional Orthopaedic Service, and its association with the accident services of the region. Oxford: Hall the Printer, [1949]

His published articles include:
 Gathorne Robert Girdlestone (1928). Arthrodesis and other operations for tuberculosis of the hip. In: The Robert Jones Birthday Volume: A collection of surgical essays. London: Humphrey Milford; Oxford: Oxford University Press. pp. 347–374.
  (1943). Acute pyogenic arthritis of the hip: an operation giving free access and effective drainage. Lancet. 241: 419–421.

References

Further reading
 Josep Trueta (1971). Gathorne Robert Girdlestone. London: for the Girdlestone Orthopaedic Society; Oxford: Oxford University Press. .

External links
 Portrait of Gathorne Robert Girdlestone by Frank S. Eastman, in the Nuffield Orthopaedic Centre, Oxford. BBC Your Paintings.

British orthopaedic surgeons
1881 births
1950 deaths
Statutory Professors of the University of Oxford
20th-century surgeons